The scrubfowl are the genus  Megapodius  of the  mound-builders, stocky, medium-large chicken-like birds with small heads and large feet in the family Megapodiidae. They are found from south-east Asia to north Australia and islands in the west Pacific.

They do not incubate their eggs with their body heat in the orthodox way, but bury them. They are best known for building a massive mound of decaying vegetation, which the male attends, adding or removing litter to regulate the internal heat while the eggs hatch. The species in taxonomic order are:

 †Pile-builder scrubfowl (Megapodius molistructor) 
 †Viti Levu scrubfowl (Megapodius amissus)

In all of the above, the name "scrubfowl" is sometimes exchanged with "megapode". Traditionally, most have been listed as subspecies of M. freycinet, but today all major authorities consider this incorrect. Nevertheless, there are unresolved issues within the genus, and for example the taxon forstenii has been considered a subspecies of M. freycinet, a subspecies of M. cumingii, or a monotypic species. An additional species, the Moluccan megapode, has sometimes been placed in Megapodius, but today most place it in the genus Eulipoa instead. The maleo is also associated with these genera, and together the three form a group.

References

External links 
 Mound-builders videos on the Internet Bird Collection

 
 
Taxa named by Joseph Paul Gaimard